David Testa Alonso (born 9 August 1984 in Gijón) is a Spanish athlete specializing in the 400 metres.

Competition record

Personal bests
Outdoor
400 metres – 46.35 (Almería 2005)
Indoor
400 metres – 47.07 (Birmingham 2007)
800 metres – 1:50.50 (Oviedo 2007)

References
IAAF profile

External links
 

1984 births
Living people
Spanish male sprinters
Sportspeople from Gijón
University of Oviedo alumni
Mediterranean Games gold medalists for Spain
Mediterranean Games medalists in athletics
Athletes (track and field) at the 2005 Mediterranean Games